The J Class of racing yachts (sometimes called "J-boats") were built to the specifications of Nathanael Herreshoff's Universal Rule. The J Class is considered the apex of the era when the Universal Rule determined eligibility in the  America's Cup.

Universal Rule

The J Class is one of several classes deriving from the Universal Rule for racing boats. The rule was established in 1903 and rates double-masted racers (classes A through H) and single-masted racers (classes I through S). From 1914 to 1937, the rule was used to determine eligibility for the Americas Cup. In the late 1920s, the trend was towards smaller boats and so agreement among American yacht clubs led to rule changes such that after 1937 the International Rule would be used for 12 Metre class boats.

Universal Rule formula
The Universal Rule formula is: 

Where:
   is boat length (a number itself derived from a formula that includes Load Waterline Length L.W.L in feet)
  is sail area
  is displacement
  is rating
 Herreshoff initially proposed an index of .2 but ratifying committees of the various yacht clubs changed this to, at various times, .18 or .185. This is, essentially, a 'fudge factor' to allow some boats designed and built prior to the adoption of the Universal Rule to compete.

The numerator contains a yacht's speed-giving elements, length and sail area, while the retarding quantity of displacement is in the denominator. Also the result will be dimensionally correct; R will be a linear unit of length (such as feet or meters).  J Class boats will have a rating of between 65 and 76 feet.  This is not the overall length of the boat but a limiting factor for the variables in the equation.  Designers are free to change any of the variables such as length or displacement but must reduce the other variables to compensate.

J Class examples 

A table of well-known J Class yachts demonstrating that application of the Universal Rule could result in a rating  between 65 and 76 feet.
(Colours: Red: America's Cup challengers;  Blue: defenders;  Green:  non-competitors).

History and evolution of the J Class

Prior to the adoption of the Universal Rule, the Seawanhaka Rule was used to govern the design of boats for inter club racing. As the Seawanhaka Rule used only two variables: Load Waterline Length and Sail Area, racing boats at the time were becoming more and more extreme.  Larger and larger sails atop shorter and wider boats leading either to unwieldy, and ultimately unsafe, boats or craft that simply were not competitive. In order to account, in some ways, for the beam and the relationship of the length overall to the load waterline length the universal rule was proposed, taking into account displacement and length, which itself was a result of a formula taking into account such things as  "quarter beam length". As different boats were designed and built, the notion of classes was derived to maintain groupings of competitive class.

Following Sir Thomas Lipton's near success in the 1920 America's Cup, he challenged again for the last time at age 79, in 1929. The challenge drew all the novelties developed in the previous decade on small boats to be ported onto large boats, and pitted British and American yacht design in a technological race. Between 1930 and 1937, the improvements brought to the design of sailboats were numerous and significant:
The high-aspect bermuda rig replaces the gaff rig on large sailboats
Solid-rod lenticular rigging for shrouds and stays
Luff and foot grooved spars with rail and slides replacing wooden hoops
Multiplication of spreader sets: one set previously (1914), two sets (1930), three sets (1934), four sets (1937)
Multiplication of the number of winches: 23 winches, Enterprise (1930)
Electrical navigational instruments borrowed from aeronautics with repeaters for windvane and anemometer, Whirlwind (1930)
"Park Avenue" boom (Enterprise, 1930) and "North Circular" boom (Rainbow, 1934) developed to trim mainsail foot
Riveted aluminium mast (Duralumin), Enterprise (1930)
Genoa Jib (Rainbow, 1934) and quadrangular jib (Endeavour, 1934)
Duralumin wing-mast, Ranger (1937)

All these improvements may not have been possible without the context of the America's Cup and the stability offered by the Universal Rule. The competition was a bit unfair because the British challengers had to be constructed in the country of the Challenging Yacht Club (a criterion still in use today), and had to sail on their own hull to the venue of the America's Cup (a criterion no longer in use today): the design for such an undertaking required the challenging boat to be more seaworthy than the American boats, whose design was purely for speed in closed waters regattas. The yachts that remain in existence are all British, and probably log more nautical miles today than they ever did. This would not have been possible if Charles Ernest Nicholson did not obtain unlimited budgets to achieve the quality of build for these yachts.

Yacht designer Clinton Hoadley Crane noted in his memoirs that "America's Cup racing has never led to good sportsmanship. The attitude of the New York Yacht Club [...] has been more that of a man in the forward position at war who has been ordered to hold his position at all costs – ." In 1930, Thomas Lipton spent $1,000,000 for his Shamrock V challenge when America was facing a stock market crash, but the NYYC still built four cup defenders. The rivalry led both countries to put on a display of true technological innovations using the maximum load waterline length authorized by the rule for Endeavour II and Ranger in 1937.

Most J Class yachts were scrapped prior to or during World War II because steel and lead had become precious to the war effort. In the post-war era, J Class racing was deemed far too expensive, so no challenge for the America's Cup was placed until 1958 with the smaller third International Rule 12 Metre class.

Rigging problems
The original yachts carried  masts, but they dismasted frequently. As a consequence, British yachtsman Sir Richard Fairey (Chairman of Fairey Aviation, and owner of Shamrock V) suggested an America's Cup challenge in the smaller K-Class. The New York Yacht Club refused the drop in size.

The J Class rule was amended in 1937 to force rigs to weigh a minimum of 6,400 lb. The larger scantling would prevent the frequent dismastings that had been previously observed in the British Big Class season of 1935.

Revival
By the 1980s only three J Class yachts were still in existence: Shamrock V, Endeavour and Velsheda, all designed by Charles Ernest Nicholson. Velsheda never served for an America's Cup challenge.

A revival of the J Class was triggered by Elizabeth Meyer, who oversaw the refits of Endeavour and Shamrock V. For several decades Velsheda lay derelict in the mud of the Hamble river – she was refitted in 1984, too, and then more completely in 1997.

In August 2001, as part of the celebration of the 150th Jubilee of America's Cup celebration, the three existing J Class racers were brought to the Isle of Wight for a round the island race.

The creation of the J Class Association in 2000 and the launch of a new replica of Ranger in 2004 accelerated the revival of the class. Several replicas and original designs were subsequently built and the association now organizes races for the J Class in Newport, Falmouth and Cowes.

The current J Class fleet comprises nine boats: Endeavour, Hanuman, Lionheart, Rainbow, Ranger, Shamrock V, Velsheda, Topaz, and, launched in January 2017, Svea.

On March 12, 2020, Svea and Topaz collided while maneuvering at the start line of the Superyacht Challenge Antigua. Both boats retired from racing with damage; two sailors were injured.

List of J Class yachts

Ten yachts were built to the J Class rule between 1930 and 1937, six in America and four in Great Britain.

Other boats raced in J Class regattas: the yachts Katoura (Starling Burgess, 1927), Resolute (Nathanael Herreshoff, 1914) and Vanitie (William Gardner, 1914) served as trial horses and most International Rule 23mR yachts were converted to the J Class, of which three remain in existence: Astra, Cambria and Candida.

Bibliography

Further reading

Dykstra Naval Architects -  J Class refit, optimization and replica design (Endeavour, Velsheda, Shamrock V, Ranger, Hanuman, Rainbow)
Sparkman & Stephens - J Class design
Hoek Design - J Class replica design (Lionheart, Topaz, Svea)
New York Times - 1989 article about Elizabeth Meyer's refit of Endeavour
 - letter 1 - letter 2 - letter 3

youtube.com - videos of J Class yachts
Classic Boat's History of the J Class

 

Development sailing classes